Meadowbank Parish Church (known until 2017 as Holyrood Abbey Church) is a congregation of the Church of Scotland in Edinburgh, Scotland. The church building was opened in December 1900 as Abbeyhill United Free Church.

The 12th-century Holyrood Abbey served as the parish church of the Canongate until the construction of the Kirk of the Canongate in 1688. Following the Disruption of 1843 in the Church of Scotland, part of the congregation of the Kirk of the Canongate left to form Holyrood Free Church. A new building was constructed by them on Abbey Strand, in front of the Palace of Holyroodhouse. In 1915 this congregation united with Abbeyhill United Free Church, henceforth using the church buildings at 83 London Road. When the United Free Church of Scotland united with the Church of Scotland in 1929, the congregation became known as Holyrood Abbey Church.

The former Holyrood United Free Church building adjacent to the Palace was used for many years as a storeroom, but in 2002 was extensively renovated and reopened as The Queen's Gallery, for art exhibitions from the Royal Collection.

The building at 83 London Road was designed by R M Cameron, and is protected as a category B listed building. It was extensively upgraded in 2006–2007.

In 2014 the minister of Holyrood Abbey Church resigned over his disagreement with the Kirk's decision to accept homosexual ministers in marriages and civil partnerships. He led many of the congregation to set up Holyrood Evangelical Church, an independent congregation.

Due to the shortage of Church of Scotland ministers, and following the schisms within Holyrood Abbey and the nearby New Restalrig Parish Church (now Willowbrae Parish Church), the Presbytery of Edinburgh took the decision to close the building on the corner of London Road and Easter Road used by London Road Church and unite that congregation with the remaining members of the Holyrood Abbey congregation. The union took place in February 2017 and the congregation is now known as Meadowbank Church, however, the majority of the congregation at London Road church choose not to join the new congregation.

References

External links
Meadowbank Church of Scotland website
Holyrood Evangelical Church website

Church of Scotland churches in Edinburgh
Listed churches in Edinburgh
Category B listed buildings in Edinburgh
Churches completed in 1900
20th-century Church of Scotland church buildings
20th-century churches in the United Kingdom